Vishwa Vikhyatharaya Payyanmar is a 2017 Indian Malayalam-language film written and directed by Rajesh Kannankara, starring Deepak Parambol, Aju Varghese, and Sudhi Koppa. It was released worldwide on 27 October 2017 by Eros International.

Plot

The friendship of five fun-loving youngsters and spreads the message that "the goodness in your heart never goes unrewarded".

Cast
Deepak Parambol as GopyKrishnan
Aju Varghese as Jithin lal/lal
Sudhi Koppa as Nirshad/Paintu Bichu
Devan as Fa.Baby John
Leema Babu as Tharuni/Tharu
Hareesh Perumanna as P.P Shibu
Bhagath Manuel as Saam
Manoj K. Jayan as Sunny
Rajesh Kannankara as Maneesh
 Kozhikode Narayan Nair as Gopalan
Sasi Kalinga as Rajappan
Balachandran Chullikkadu as Govindan Master
Sunil Sugatha as Cameo Appearance
G. K. Pillai as Cameo Appearance
Preetha Pradeep  as Cameo Appearance
Daya Ashwathy

Release

The film was released worldwide on 27 October 2017 by Eros International.

References

External links
 

2010s Malayalam-language films
Indian comedy films
2017 comedy films